John Hugo Aronson (September 1, 1891 – February 25, 1978) was an American businessman and politician from the Republican Party and the 14th Governor of the State of Montana.

Biography
John Hugo Aronson was born in Gällstad, Älvsborg County, Sweden.  He was one  of five children born to  Aron Johanson (1856–1927) and Rika Ryding Johannsen (1857–1940). Aronson was married twice, to Matilda Langane and then to Rose McClure.

Career
In 1915 Aronson filed for a  homestead in Elk Basin, Montana. In 1922 oil was discovered in the Kevin Sunburst Oil Field  in Toole County, among the richest Montana's natural gas and oil fields. Aronson operated his own rig-building outfit. He soon added a trucking business to the rig-building company and started advertising as "The Galloping Swede". He served as a member of Montana House of Representatives in 1938 and the Montana Senate in 1944.

Aronson ran for Governor of Montana in 1952, challenging incumbent Democratic Governor John W. Bonner, whom he ended up narrowly defeating. When he ran for re-election in 1956, he was opposed by State Attorney General Arnold Olsen, whom he defeated by a slim margin to win his second and final term as governor. Aronson authorized the exclusive revenue for the state Highway Department with the creation of state gasoline user taxes. Governor Aronson also authorized the creation of the Legislative Council to assist the legislative branch in the creation of necessary law.

Aronson died in the Veterans Hospital at Columbia Falls, Montana, exactly ten years after his wife's death.  He was buried in Pleasant View Cemetery, Mondovi, Lincoln County, Washington.

References

Further reading
Aronson, J. Hugo and L.O. Brockmann.  The Galloping Swede. Missoula, MT: Mountain Press Publishing Co., 1970

External links
Biography and Papers of Aronson from the Northwest Digital Archives

1891 births
1978 deaths
People from Ulricehamn Municipality
Republican Party governors of Montana
Republican Party Montana state senators
Republican Party members of the Montana House of Representatives
Swedish emigrants to the United States
20th-century American politicians
People from Cut Bank, Montana